Thomas A. (Tim) Mutch (August 26, 1931 – October 6, 1980) was an American geologist and planetary scientist. He was a professor at Brown University from 1960 until his death. He disappeared during descent from Mount Nun in the Kashmir Himalayas.

Biography
He published books about the geology of the Moon (Geology of the Moon: A Stratigraphic View, published 1973) and of Mars (The Geology of Mars, published 1977). As head of the Viking surface photography team, he is quoted as commenting on the first pictures: "This is just an incredible scene. It looks safe and very interesting."

A crater on Mars was named in his honor, and the Viking 1 lander was formally renamed "Thomas A. Mutch Memorial Station" on January 7, 1981 by then NASA Administrator, Robert A. Frosch; the engineering model currently displayed in the Smithsonian Institution has a small plaque beside it commemorating this, and a note that it will be left with the actual lander when circumstances permit. The Thomas "Tim" Mutch Memorial Fund was established in 1981 by his family and friends.

See also
List of people who disappeared

References

External links
 Short biography

1931 births
1980 deaths
Scientists from Rochester, New York
Writers from Rochester, New York
1980s missing person cases
20th-century American geologists
Brown University faculty
Missing person cases in India
Planetary scientists